Ana Maria Mulvoy-Ten (born 8 May 1992) is an English actress. She is known for playing the character of Amber Millington on the British boarding school drama House of Anubis.

Career 
Mulvoy-Ten's first role was as an extra in Harry Potter and the Chamber of Secrets. In 2008 she was cast in her first starring role as Rosi in Cosas de la vida.

Mulvoy-Ten's first break out role was in the Nickelodeon show House of Anubis as Amber Millington. She went on to star in 2015's The Girl in the Book, where she received praise by critics such as Andy Webster of The New York Times for her portrayal of young Alice. In 2017 she was announced to join the cast of American Crime as trafficked teenage sex worker Shae Reese.

She has been a model for photographer Tyler Shields in multiple shoots.

Personal life 

Mulvoy-Ten was born in London, but grew up between Spain and England. 
She attended the all girls private school ‘Pipers Corner’ in England

Filmography

Awards and nominations

References

External links 
 
 

1992 births
English child actresses
English television actresses
Living people
21st-century English actresses
British people of Spanish descent
British people of Irish descent